is a Japanese manga series written and illustrated by Takashi Wada. It was serialized in Shogakukan's seinen manga magazine Monthly Big Comic Spirits from December 2018 to August 2020, with its chapters collected in four tankōbon volumes.

Publication
Written and illustrated by Takashi Wada, Vivre Yōsai-ten was serialized in Shogakukan's seinen manga magazine Monthly Big Comic Spirits from December 27, 2018, to August 26, 2020. Shogakukan collected its chapters in four tankōbon volumes, released from June 12, 2019, to January 12, 2021.

The manga has been licensed in France by Soleil.

Volume list

References

External links
 

Fantasy anime and manga
Seinen manga
Shogakukan manga